Jerome Benton (born September 19, 1962) is an American musical performer, backup dancer and comedic actor. He can be seen in music videos by Janet Jackson and Prince, but he is known for his association with Morris Day and The Time.

Benton is the brother of The Time bassist Terry Lewis and worked closely with the band behind the scenes in its initial stages. During one performance, lead singer Morris Day asked for someone to bring him a mirror. Benton responded by ripping a mirror out of the club's restroom and bringing it on stage for Day to comb his hair. This act elevated Benton's integration into the band as a comic foil to Day, along with his dancing and providing backing vocals. In 1983, when Jimmy Jam and Terry Lewis missed a concert in San Antonio, Benton was tasked by Prince to pretend to fill in for Lewis on stage with his bass unplugged, while Prince provided the bass parts backstage. (Jam and Lewis were eventually fired after the tour.)

Benton appeared in the 1984 film Purple Rain with the rest of The Time and assumed the role of Morris Day's bodyguard and valet. He also appeared in Prince's second film Under the Cherry Moon, and in Prince's third film Graffiti Bridge. The chemistry between Day and Benton was well received. Although The Time soon dissolved after Day started pursuing a solo career, Prince retained Benton, as well as Jellybean Johnson and Paul Peterson for the short-lived project The Family.
 
Benton reunited with The Family on December 13, 2003 for a single charity performance along with other acts formerly associated with Prince.

Benton joined Prince alumnus Jill Jones, Greg Brooks & Wally Safford in Detroit June 2017 for "The Purple Block Party: Prince" sponsored by UrbanOne Station KISS 105.9 in honor of the late performer's birthday.

In January 2018, Benton joined his brother Terry Lewis in support of Super Bowl Live in Minneapolis. Jerome was featured in several performances including fDeluxe The Family, The Time, Morris Day & The Time and Sheila E.

Benton returned to Minneapolis in support of the PRN Alumni Foundation in April 2019. The event featured a performance from Ingrid Chavez with an Author's panel featuring Chris Riemenschneider, Jim Walsh, Allen Beaulieu, Tamar Davis & Duane Tudahl.  

Jerome continues his hosting duties of The Purple Paisley Brunch. This annual event series features the DJs spinning the best of the Minneapolis Sound with an unlimited brunch. This event is cultivated by Tonya Giddens of BklynGurl Productions in New York. The September 2019 edition will take place at Taj II Lounge and Event Space. Featured guests will include Madhouse album cover girl and muse Maneca Lightner and several surprise guests.

References

External links

Jerome Benton website

1962 births
Living people
American male singers
The Revolution (band) members
The Original 7ven members